Gregory "Greg" Hyde (born 18 March 1963) is an Australian windsurfer. He competed in the Windglider event at the 1984 Summer Olympics, finishing in 6th place.

References

External links
 
 
 

1963 births
Living people
Australian windsurfers
Australian male sailors (sport)
Olympic sailors of Australia
Sailors at the 1984 Summer Olympics – Windglider
Place of birth missing (living people)